The Extraordinary and Plenipotentiary Ambassador of Peru to the French Republic is the official representative of the Republic of Peru to the French Republic. The Ambassador to France is also accredited to the Principality of Monaco.

Both countries established relations in 1826 and have maintained them since. Relations were severed once during World War II with the French State of Philippe Pétain, with Peru instead establishing relations with Free France and normalizing its relations with said government after the war. In 1973, Peru again severed diplomatic relations with France in protest of French nuclear testing in the South Pacific Ocean. The rupture lasted until 1975.

List of representatives

See also
List of ambassadors of France to Peru

References

France
Peru